Paese (Venetian: Paexe) is a comune (municipality) in the Province of Treviso in the Italian region Veneto, located about  northwest of Venice and about  west of Treviso.

Geography
The municipality of Paese contains the frazioni (subdivisions, mainly villages and hamlets) of Castagnole, Padernello, Porcellengo and Postioma.

Paese borders the following municipalities: Istrana, Morgano, Ponzano Veneto, Quinto di Treviso, Trevignano, Treviso, Volpago del Montello.

The people of Paese speak both Italian and Venetian Language (the dialect of the Veneto region).

Demographic evolution

References

External links

 Paese official website

Cities and towns in Veneto